Annette Viveka Tånnander-Bank (born Annette Tånnander on 13 February 1958 in Malmö, Sweden) is a Swedish athlete who competed in the heptathlon and high jump events. She represented her native country twice in the Olympics: She was seventh in the 1976 Montreal Olympic high jump, clearing 1.87m, and finished 14th in the 1984 Los Angeles Olympic heptathlon with 5908 points.

References

External links
 Sports-reference.com Profile
 Annette Tånnander bio
 Picture of Annette Tånnander from 1984
  

1958 births
Living people
Swedish heptathletes
Swedish female high jumpers
Athletes (track and field) at the 1976 Summer Olympics
Athletes (track and field) at the 1984 Summer Olympics
Sportspeople from Malmö
Olympic athletes of Sweden
20th-century Swedish women